Skateboarding at the 2020 Summer Olympics was an event held in the 2020 Summer Olympics in Tokyo, Japan. It was the debut appearance of skateboarding at the Summer Olympics. Skateboarding was one of four new sports added to the Olympic program for 2020; it is also provisionally approved for the 2024 Summer Olympic games. The proposal to add skateboarding to the Olympics was approved in August 2016.

Qualification

There were 80 quota spots available for skateboarding. Each event had 20 competitors: three qualified from the World Championships, 16 from the world rankings, and one from the host country of the Olympics, Japan. The qualification for the event was managed by World Skate.

Events 
Four medal events were held: Both events consist of two rounds, prelims and finals. The Park and Street events had their own specially designed courses that took into account gender and stance in order to have equality.

Men
Park
Street
Women
Park
Street

Competition schedule 
All times are Japan Standard Time (UTC+9).

Participating NOCs
A total of 80 skateboarders from 25 National Olympic Committees (NOCs) participated.

Medal summary

Medal table

Medal events

See also
Roller sports at the 2018 Asian Games
Roller speed skating at the 2018 Summer Youth Olympics
Roller sports at the 2019 Pan American Games
Cycling at the 2020 Summer Olympics

References

External links
 Video - Full Replay: Olympic Games Tokyo 2020 Women's Street First Skateboarding Contest (olympics.com, IOC, OBS, english)
 Video - Full Replay: Olympic Games Tokyo 2020 Men's Street First Skateboarding Contest (olympics.com, IOC, OBS, english)
 Video - Full Replay: Olympic Games Tokyo 2020 Women's Park First Skateboarding Contest (olympics.com, IOC, OBS, english)
 Video - Full Replay: Olympic Games Tokyo 2020 Men's Park First Skateboarding Contest (olympics.com, IOC, OBS, english)
 Results book 

 
2020
2020 Summer Olympics events